Vice-Admiral Daniel Nicolas Mainguy CMM, CD  (2 December 1930–17 August 2010) was a Canadian Forces officer who served as Vice Chief of the Defence Staff.

Career
The son of Vice-Admiral Rollo Mainguy, Mainguy joined the Royal Canadian Navy in 1949, initially in the Reserve and then, from 1950, in the Regular service. He went on to be Director of Strategic Planning in 1973, Chief of Maritime Doctrine and Operations in 1976 and Chief of Staff to the Commander-in-Chief, Western Atlantic in 1979. After that he became Deputy Chief of the Defence Staff in 1982 and Vice Chief of the Defence Staff in 1983 before retiring in 1985. He died in August 2010.

Awards and decorations
Mainguy's personal awards and decorations include the following:

References

1930 births
2010 deaths
Commanders of the Order of Military Merit (Canada)
Vice Chiefs of the Defence Staff (Canada)
Canadian admirals
Canadian military personnel from British Columbia